The Georgetown University Student Association (GUSA) is the undergraduate student government of Georgetown University in Washington, D.C. The GUSA bylaws state that the organization's mission is "to (i) empower Hoyas by giving them control over resources, (ii) improve the student quality of life, (iii) safeguard Hoya rights, (iv) involve Hoyas in the governance of the University, and (v) ensure that the University conducts itself in an ethical and responsible manner."

Structure

Executive Branch
The Executive Branch is made up of a President and Vice President, elected by the undergraduate student body each November to lead for the following calendar year, as well as a staff whose size and structure is largely up to the discretion of the President and Vice President. Since 2023, the executive staff has been restructured and expanded to address many issues raised by members of the undergraduate student body. Membership on cabinet staff, executive staff, and general staff positions is application-based and open to all undergraduate students. The President and Vice President also appoint student representatives to a variety of external boards and committees, and all executive staff positions and external board appointments are subject to review and confirmation by the Senate.

*Due to a change in election timelines, beginning in 2022 the GUSA Executive serves for a calendar year rather than a school year

Legislative Branch
The Legislative Branch is made up of a 29-person Senate which can amend the GUSA bylaws, confirm executive and judicial appointments, and engage in advocacy through mechanisms that include resolutions and ad hoc committees. The Senate is led by a Speaker and Vice Speaker during the academic year and over the summer. The Senate also controls the process by which more than $1 million is allocated to student organizations. The process is overseen by the Senate's Finance and Appropriations Committee, which allocates the sum total funds generated by the Student Activities Fee ($164 per student in 2018) each year to five club advisory boards, the Lecture Fund, the Georgetown Programming Board, and other groups.

The April session runs from April to November consisting of 22 representatives before the new incoming Freshmen class holds elections. The November session runs from November to April with all 29 representatives after elections are held for the Freshmen Class and At-Large senate seats. Leadership elections are held the first meeting following each election cycle.

Judicial Branch
The Judicial Branch is made up of a 3-person Constitutional Council, which oversees all internal GUSA disputes and is charged with the stewardship of the GUSA Constitution.

Legacy
Student government has been involved throughout its history in the establishment, expansion, and improvement of a plethora of student resources and services. This legacy includes the Georgetown University Transportation Shuttles (GUTS) system, which was founded in 1974 and expanded several times since then through the work of student government, and campus dining, whose improvement has been a focus of student government for decades. Other initiatives include:

 The Georgetown University Lecture Fund, which was founded by Student Government in the 1970s and became an independent organization in 2005
The GeorgetownOne Card (GoCard), in whose 2001 creation GUSA played a pivotal role
 The Collegiate Readership Program, a GUSA initiative which provided students with free copies of major newspapers from 2008 to 2015, and 2023 onwards
 The Summer Fellows program, which was founded by GUSA in 2009 and now provides free on-campus summer housing to low-income students under the auspices of the Georgetown Scholarship Program (GSP)
 The Student Advocacy Office (SAO), which was founded by GUSA in 2012 and continues to provide assistance to students navigating the university's disciplinary systems
 The Georgetown University Farmer's Market, which was organized by GUSA in 2018 and continues under its own board every Wednesday during the school year
 The Georgetown Disability Cultural Initiative, which welcomed its first Associate Director, Dr. Amy Kenny, in the summer of 2022

Perhaps the most famous service established by student government is Students of Georgetown, Inc., also known as "The Corp," which was founded by SG President Roger Cochetti and Vice President Nancy Kent in October 1971. Until the early 1990s, the board of The Corp remained under the control of student government and the activities of the two organizations were closely linked. Today, The Corp operates seven businesses on Georgetown's campus and is considered the largest student-run nonprofit corporation in the world.

In addition to improving student resources and services, student government at Georgetown has long played a central role in the allocation of resources to student activities. This has been the case since at least the 1970s, but a notable change occurred in 2001 when a GUSA-led effort successfully established a "Student Activities Fee" to be collected from all students as part of undergraduate tuition, and disbursed to all student organizations by GUSA itself. Today, GUSA allocates more than $1 million per year to eight advisory boards, which in turn allocate their funds to over 300 student organizations.

Student government has traditionally remained focused on student life, but at times the organization has also contributed its voice to political debates on campus and around the country. In 1997, for example, GUSA vocally supported the controversial addition of crucifixes to university classrooms. And in 2011, GUSA President Mike Meaney organized a group letter from more than 100 student body presidents to President Barack Obama and Speaker of the House John Boehner urging a bipartisan compromise on the national debt ceiling.

History

Georgetown University Athletic Association: 1874 to 1920 
The earliest form of student government at Georgetown was the Georgetown University Athletic Association, which formed in 1874 in order to coordinate athletics amongst the students of Georgetown College. The Athletic Association was relatively informal in its structure and duties until 1889, when students drafted a constitution and began annual elections. Its leadership consisted of three elected students –– the Vice President, Secretary, and Treasurer –– as well as the managers of each athletic team and a Jesuit advisor who held the symbolic title of "President." That symbolism was soon relinquished, however, and by 1900 the student leader of the Athletic Association was called its President. The Association's duties were almost entirely athletic in nature; it coordinated schedules for athletic practices and games, managed the sharing of athletic equipment, and raised funds in order to support activities related to athletics and school spirit.

The Athletic Association was also called "The Yard" interchangeably, in likely reference to the College Yard in which athletic games were played. Its annual leaders were thus referred to as the Yard President, Yard Secretary, and Yard Treasurer.

The 3 Student Councils: 1920 to 1969 
In 1920, a College Student Council was formed with representatives from each class year. The Athletic Association continued to exist for the limited purpose of coordinating athletics, but the College Student Council supplanted it as the most important and authoritative elected body of the College and thus assumed the title "The Yard." Unlike the Athletic Association, the Student Council's duties were wide-ranging, including advocacy for student interests and the coordination of social life in the College. Students in the College continued to elect three executives each year –– the Yard President, Yard Secretary, and Yard Treasurer –– who oversaw both the old Athletic Association and the new College Student Council.

In 1940, the students of Georgetown College approved a new constitution for the College Student Council which included representation for the College's most significant student organizations alongside the representatives of each class. Over the next thirty years, the organizations represented on the Council would include the Georgetown College Journal, the Collegiate Club, the Glee Club, The Hoya, the International Relations Club, Mask and Bauble, the Philodemic Society, the Sodality, the Washington Club, and WGTB Radio.

Around the same time that the College Student Council was formed in 1920, the students of the newly-established School of Foreign Service (SFS) founded an SFS Student Council. Like its original College counterpart, the SFS Student Council included representatives from each class year as well as the whole school and took on a variety of responsibilities including advocacy and social life. When the School of Languages and Linguistics was founded in 1949 and the School of Business in 1957, their student bodies were incorporated into the SFS Student Council's representative infrastructure. By the early 1960s, the group was called the "East Campus Student Council" or "Walsh Area Student Council" to reflect the fact that its constituency now included three undergraduate schools but that all three schools were located on Georgetown's "East Campus" (the block between 35th and 36th Streets NW, on which the Walsh Building stands).

At some point in the 1940s or 50s, the students of the Nursing School founded the Nursing School Student Council, which, like its SFS counterpart, included class representatives and school-wide elected officers but not representatives of student organizations. The first women to hold elected office in student government at Georgetown did so on the Nursing School Student Council, since the school was originally open only to women.

Administrative collaboration and social interaction between Georgetown's five separate undergraduate schools began to increase in the 1950s and 60s, and by the mid-60s there was an unprecedented sense of shared community amongst students of the five schools. Students also began to recognize the practical benefits of university-wide collaboration on the issues that affected students in all schools equally. As a result, several attempts were made throughout the 1960s to unify the three disparate student councils. Unification efforts were finally successful in March 1968, when a referendum passed among the constituencies of all three student councils. In December 1968, students from all schools elected 40 delegates to a constitutional convention, which was charged with drafting a structure for the new, unified student government. The convention released its plans within a few months, and the first university-wide student government election was held in May 1969.

Student Government (SG): 1969 to 1984 
Simply called the Student Government (SG), the new unified institution included a President and Vice President elected by the entire student body, and a Senate with 5 students elected from each school and 5 from each class (40 in total).

Georgetown University Student Association (GUSA): 1984 to present 
In 1984, students replaced the SG with the Georgetown University Student Association (GUSA), a new institution that over time came to be loosely based on the tripartite structure of the federal government of the United States. GUSA's executive branch included a President and Vice President, elected annually by the student body. Its legislative branch consisted of a 16-person Assembly, with 4 representatives from each class year––thus eliminating the last vestiges of differentiated representation for the five schools. After 1990, GUSA also had a judicial branch, consisting of a 3-person Constitutional Council empowered to resolve constitutional disputes within the student government.

The GUSA Constitution has been amended three times:

 In March 1990, students replaced the original GUSA Constitution with a shorter, more streamlined document. They also created a Constitutional Council.
 In October 2006, students replaced the Assembly with the Senate, a larger body made up of representatives from geographic districts across Georgetown's campus.
 In February 2018, students voted to maintain the Senate's larger size but return it to a system of representation based on class year, rather than geography.

Notable alumni

Many notable individuals in business, politics, religion, and the arts began their careers in Georgetown's student government, including:

 Condé M. Nast (C 1894), Secretary of The Yard in 1892–93 and founder of the Condé Nast publishing empire
 Matthew R. Denver (C 1891), Vice President of The Yard in 1891–92 and a member of Congress from Ohio
 James P. B. Duffy (C 1901), President of The Yard in 1900–01 and a member of Congress from New York
 Philip A. Hart (C 1934), President of The Yard in 1933–34 and a Senator from Michigan
 George H. Guilfoyle (C 1935), President of The Yard in 1934–35 and a Roman Catholic Bishop
 Richard J. McCooey (C 1952), President of The Yard in 1951–52 and founder of Georgetown restaurants 1789, The Tombs, and F. Scott's
 Joseph R. Baczko (F 1967), Treasurer of the East Campus Student Council in 1965–66, President of Blockbuster Entertainment, and founder and President of Toys "R" Us
 Frank A. Keating (C 1966), President of The Yard in 1965–66 and Governor of Oklahoma
 William J. Clinton (F 1968), freshman class president in 1964–65, sophomore class president in 1965–66, and the 42nd President of the United States
 William Doyle (C 1972), freshman representative to The Yard in 1968–69 and Chair of the Georgetown University Board of Directors
Jack W. Leslie (F 1976), President of the Student Government in 1974–75 and Chairman of Weber Shandwick and the U.S. African Development Foundation
David L. Goldwyn (C 1981), President of the Student Government in 1980–81, Assistant Secretary of Energy from 1999–2001, and National Security Deputy to the US Ambassador to the United Nations from 1997–98
 S. Fitzgerald Haney (F 1990), President of GUSA in 1989–90 and Ambassador to Costa Rica
Stephanie H. Sandlin (C 1993), Chair of the GUSA Assembly in 1992–93, a member of Congress from South Dakota, and President of Augustana University
Richard R. Heitzmann (B 1994), President of GUSA in 1993–94 and co-founder of venture capital firm FirstMark Capital
John P. Cronan (C 1998), President of GUSA in 1997–99 and a United States District Judge of the United States District Court for the Southern District of New York, formerly Acting Assistant Attorney General for the Department of Justice's Criminal Division
John Glennon (C 1999), President of GUSA in 1998–99 and Headmaster of Georgetown Preparatory School
Mohammed bin Hamad Al Thani (F 2009), first President of GUQ-SGA in 2006–07 and Managing Director of the Qatar Supreme Committee for the 2022 FIFA World Cup

Qatar campus

The Georgetown University in Qatar's Student Government Association (GUQ-SGA) is an annually elected, student-run governance association that works to represent the student body of Georgetown University's Qatar campus and liaise with university administrators. In addition, the President of SGA chairs the Student Liaison Commission (SLC), and the Vice President chairs the Student Activities Commission (SAC).

Structure 
The SGA has 11 members, which are replaced annually. An executive group made up of the President, the Vice President, and the Public Relations Officer guides and presides over the functions of the SGA. A core group of 8 members represents the interests of the student body, with two representatives from each undergraduate class. The SGA meets on a weekly basis and discusses the issues or concerns raised by the student body. The President is also a member of the Dean's subcommittees on various issues such as sustainability. The introduction of the Red Square, a replica of the Red Square in Georgetown University's main campus in Washington D.C., was a result of an initiative of the SGA led by President Malak Elmoh (SFS '21).
With a view to increase their presence and being more accessible, the SGA launched their official website during the SGA Town Hall on February 5, 2023. Launching the new website, President Kurian said, "The website has been carefully designed to reflect on the student life at GU-Q and with an express view to answer their entire needs. In addition to answering the questions, we will also be updating the website with the decisions and actions that the SGA has been taking during their meetings."

Sheikh Mohammed bin Hamad bin Khalifa Al Thani (SFS '09), the first President of the SGA, was elected in 2006. Since then, the SGA have had a total of 15 presidents:

Senate 
The Senate of GUQ-SGA is made up of two class representatives from each batch at GUQ. They work alongside the SGA President and the executive board to accomplish and meet the student needs. Apart from representing students within GUQ, the SGA also represents them in the Education City Student Government Association (ECSGA), an initiative started by SGA President Hadi Darvishi in 2009 to combine the Student Governments of various universities in Education City. In 2022, under the leadership of President Kurian, GUQ-SGA hosted a meeting of the ECSGA at Georgetown University in Qatar, which was the first meeting of ECSGA in about four years. GUQ-SGA also holds strong connections with the Georgetown University Student Association (GUSA) and Georgetown University Graduate Student Government (GradGov) on the Main Campus as part of their ‘One Georgetown’ initiative.

References

External links
GUSA Public Documents Vault

Georgetown University
Georgetown University student organizations